The boys' high jump competition at the 2010 Summer Youth Olympics was held on 17–21 August 2010 in Bishan Stadium.

Schedule

Results

Qualification

The top 8 jumpers qualified to the A Final, while the other jumpers competed in the B Final.

Finals

B Final

A Final

External links
 iaaf.org - Men's high jump
 

Athletics at the 2010 Summer Youth Olympics